The 2000 Croatia Open, also known as the International Championship of Croatia, was a men's tennis tournament played on outdoor clay courts in Umag, Croatia that was part of the International Series of the 2000 ATP Tour. It was the 11th edition of the tournament and was held from 17 July until 23 July 2000. Second-seeded Marcelo Ríos won the singles title.

Finals

Singles

 Marcelo Ríos defeated  Mariano Puerta, 7–6(7–1), 4–6, 6–3
 It was Ríos' 1st singles title of the year and the 16th of his career.

Doubles

 Álex López Morón /  Albert Portas defeated  Ivan Ljubičić /  Lovro Zovko, 6–1, 3–6, 6–3

See also
 2000 Croatian Bol Ladies Open

References

External links
 ITF tournament edition details

Croatia Open Umag
Croatia Open
2000 in Croatian tennis